Ryan Ghietti (born 22 July 1989) is an Italy international rugby league footballer who plays in the halves or as a hooker for the Northern Pride in the Queensland Cup. Ghietti has represented the Italian national team, most notably as a member of their 2013 and 2017 World Cup squads.

Early life
Ghietti was born in Innisfail, Queensland, Australia.  

He played his junior rugby league for the Innisfail Brothers. He is of Italian descent.

Playing career
Ghietti has represented Italy in the 2013 World Cup qualifying tournament in 2011, the 2013 World Cup, and the 2017 World Cup qualifying tournament in 2016. He was named captain of the Northern Pride for the 2016 season.

Personal life
Ghietti's father Les died in March 2015 from cancer.

References

External links

2017 RLWC profile

1989 births
Living people
Australian people of Italian descent
Australian rugby league players
Italy national rugby league team players
Northern Pride RLFC players
Rugby league players from Innisfail, Queensland
Rugby league halfbacks